Rolando Vargas (born 10 April 1939) is a Bolivian footballer. He played in five matches for the Bolivia national football team in 1967. He was also part of Bolivia's squad for the 1967 South American Championship.

References

External links
 

1939 births
Living people
Bolivian footballers
Bolivia international footballers
Place of birth missing (living people)
Association football forwards